Hamondiidae is a family of copepods belonging to the order Harpacticoida.

Genera:
 Ambunguipes Huys, 1990
 Hamondia Huys, 1990
 Lucayostratiotes Huys, 1990

References

Copepods